David Rice and Sean Thornley were the defending champions but lost in the first round.
Austin Krajicek and Tennys Sandgren defeated Brydan Klein and Dane Propoggia in the finals by a score 7-67-4, 6–4.

Seeds

Draw

Draw

References
 Main Draw

Turk Telecom Izmir Cup - Doubles
2013 Doubles